Felix Poletti (born 23 July 1965) is a Swiss skeleton racer who has competed since 1995. He won a bronze medal in the men's skeleton event at the 1998 FIBT World Championships in St. Moritz.

Poletti finished 16th in the men's skeleton event at the 2002 Winter Olympics in Salt Lake City.

References

2002 men's skeleton results
Men's skeleton world championship medalists since 1989
Skeletonsport.com profile

1965 births
Living people
Skeleton racers at the 2002 Winter Olympics
Swiss male skeleton racers
Olympic skeleton racers of Switzerland